Kiama Heights is a semi-rural locality in the Illawarra, south of Kiama in New South Wales, Australia. It is located on the coast of the Tasman Sea on either side of the Princes Highway.

Climate 
The climate is humid subtropical (Köppen: Cfa), but areas like Bare Bluff or the Billys Lookout Observatory in the southern extreme have an oceanic climate (Cfb), being the northernmost places in this climatic category along the Australian coast.

References 

Localities in New South Wales
Municipality of Kiama